Eiríkr or Eiríkur Magnússon (1 February 1833 – 24 January 1913) was an Icelandic scholar at the University of Cambridge, who taught Old Norse to William Morris, translated numerous Icelandic sagas into English in collaboration with him, and played an important role in the movement to study the history and literature of the Norsemen in Victorian England.

Biography
Born in Berufjörður in the east of Iceland, Eiríkr was sent to England in 1862 by the Icelandic Bible Society, and his first translations there were of mediaeval Christian texts.

In 1871, with the assistance of Sir Henry Holland, 1st Baronet and of Alexander Beresford Hope, MP for Cambridge, he became an under-librarian at the Cambridge University Library, where he worked until the end of 1909. In 1893 he also became lecturer in Icelandic.

Eiríkr lectured and organised famine relief for Iceland in 1875 and 1882 and fell out with Guðbrandur Vigfússon, a fellow Icelandic scholar who was at Oxford and had been his friend, over that and his preference for modernised Icelandic in translating the Bible; Guðbrandur was a purist.

Like many Icelandic scholars in Britain at the time, Eiríkr gave Icelandic lessons as a source of income; his first pupil was probably Sir Edmund Walker Head, 8th Baronet in 1863, and he taught some by post. Another was George E. J. Powell, who had supported him financially when he first came to England and with whom he translated Jón Arnason's Icelandic folktales and worked on a translation of Hávarðar saga Ísfirðings that remained unpublished.

Most famously, he taught William Morris and collaborated with him on translating a number of sagas. Within a year of Morris beginning his studies with Eiríkr, their Story of Grettir the Strong was published (1869). In 1870 they published the first English translation of Völsungasaga. In 1871 Eiríkr and his wife accompanied Morris to Iceland, where Eiríkr went with Morris on a tour of "saga steads" and other places of interest.

Between 1891 and 1905 they published a six-volume Saga Library, which included Heimskringla and the first English translations of Hávarðar saga Ísfirðings, Hænsa-Þóris saga and Eyrbyggja Saga. Eiríkr defended Morris against York Powell's criticism of his archaic style. Volume 6 of the Saga Library, volume 4 of the Heimskringla, is an index that is entirely Eiríkr's work, published in 1905 after Morris's death.

Eiríkr was married to Sigríður Einarsdóttir, a descendant of Egill Skallagrímsson.  She campaigned to improve education for girls in Iceland.

He is buried in the Mill Road cemetery, Cambridge.

Publications 

The Saga Library series
  
  
  
  
 

Other Saga
  , e-text
  , e-text
  
 , introduction by H. Halliday Sparling , e-text
 , introduction by H. Halliday Sparling
  , e-text
  , Gunnlaug the Worm-tongue and Raven the Skald; Frithof the Bold; Viglund the Fair; Hogni and Hedinn; Roi the Fool; Thorstein Staff-smitten
 

Other
  , Elves; Water-Monsters; Trolls; Ghosts and Goblins; Misc.
 , God and the Evil One; Paradise and Hell; Divine Punishment; Historical Legends; Outlaws; Tales; Comic Stories; Appendix
  , as editor and translator
 

Journal articles
  
  
  , reprinted from Proc. Cambridge Philogical Society, October 1884, No.IX
  , paper for the Viking Club Society for Northern Research

Icelandic

References

Sources

Further reading

 
 
Reprinted  in :

External links
 Eiríkr Magnússon at Dansk Biografisk Lexikon 
 
 
 

1833 births
1913 deaths
19th-century translators
Cambridge University Librarians
Knights of the Order of the Dannebrog
Old Norse studies scholars
Eirikr Magnusson
Eirikr Magnusson
Eirikr Magnusson
Eirikr Magnusson